The Liaison Committee may refer to the:

 Liaison Committee (House of Commons of the United Kingdom)
 Liaison Committee (House of Lords)
 Canadian House of Commons Liaison Committee